The Ohio Burgee is the official flag of the U.S. state of Ohio. It is a triangular swallowtail flag, the only non-rectangular U.S. state flag. Its red, white, and blue elements symbolize the state's natural features and order of admission into the Union. A prominent disc in the flag's triangular canton is suggestive of the state's name. This flag was adopted in 1945.

The flag was designed in 1901 by John Eisenmann for the Pan-American Exposition and adopted in 1902. Before that, for nearly a century after statehood, Ohio did not have a legally authorized state flag. One unsuccessful proposal had called for a design based on the state seal.

Ohio has adopted an official salute to the flag and the official folding procedure gives it 17 folds. The Ohio flag has influenced a number of logos and municipal flags within the state. A scarlet-colored gubernatorial flag is based on the state seal.

Design

The Ohio state flag's design is defined in the Ohio Revised Code, section 5.01:

In addition to resembling the letter O and a buckeye nut, the flag's annulus also represents "the original territory of Ohio" in the Northwest Territory.

Ohio's flag is the only non-rectangular U.S. state flag. It is a rare example of a non-quadrilateral civil flag, another well-known example being the flag of Nepal. According to vexillologist Whitney Smith, it may be loosely based upon cavalry flags of the Civil War and Spanish–American War. The flag has been officially defined as a "burgee" since 2002, even though burgees are typically used as maritime flags. Its shape, lack of text, and mirror symmetry allow it to be flown or hung in various orientations without affecting legibility. On account of the flag's uncommon shape, foreign manufacturers have occasionally set the entire design against a white, rectangular field. The flag of Nepal has similarly been turned into a rectangle, either by mistake or expediency, due to the unusual dimensions of the flag.

History 
For nearly a century after statehood, Ohio had no legally authorized state flag. The state militia carried regimental colors based on the Stars and Stripes, with the addition of "a large eagle, with the number of the regiment and the prescribed number of stars above".

Arsenal flag 

By the early 1850s, Ohio expressed interest in adopting a state flag, as several other states had already done. In late 1860, Quartermaster General David L. Wood and Adjutant General Henry B. Carrington devised a flag consisting of the state seal upon a white field. They had it flown above the Ohio State Arsenal in Columbus, in hopes that it might someday become the state flag. On January 17, 1861, at a banquet organized by the Columbus Typographical Union Local #5, future U.S. President James A. Garfield gave a speech defending the national flag as the only flag Ohio's soldiers would march to battle under. The generals, in attendance, were moved to set aside their proposal and hoist the Stars and Stripes in its place. Later that year, Wood and Carrington joined fellow Ohioans in battle under the 34-star Union flag, which would serve as the inspiration for a state banner decades later.

Eisenmann's guidon 

In 1901, Cleveland architect John Eisenmann was commissioned to design an exhibition hall for his state at the Pan-American Exposition in Buffalo, New York. He developed a distinctive flag to fly over each corner of the Ohio Building. The wool flags officially represented the Ohio Pan-American Exposition Commission rather than the state. On July 18, Governor George K. Nash visited the exposition, where he was presented with one of the flags, which is now held in the Ohio History Connection collections. Eisenmann secured a U.S. design patent for his design, which he described as "a triangular forked or swallow-tailed flag corresponding to the shape generally known as a 'cavalry-guidon' or 'broad pennant.'"

In 1902, State Representative William S. McKinnon, a member of the Ohio Pan-American Exposition Commission, introduced House Bill 213 designating Eisenmann's design as the official flag. It became law on May 9, making it the 20th U.S. state flag or banner. (Eisenmann had assigned his patent, which had a term of three and a half years, to the State of Ohio on April 24.)

Because Eisenmann's design deviated from the "seal on a bedsheet" design then nearly universal among state flags, the press looked overseas for precedents: the layout was likened to either the flag of Cuba or of the Philippines, while the red and white annulus was derided for its similarity to the sun on the Japanese flag.

Initially, Ohio's flag was seldom used, in part due to the prevailing opinion that the Stars and Stripes should hold a monopoly on patriotic displays. Similar sentiment hindered the adoption of municipal flags in Cleveland and Cincinnati, to the extent that both were downplayed as mere "banners" for promotional purposes. In 1903, it was reported that, among state politicians, only Nash displayed the guidon.

In the century following its adoption, the guidon gained significant popularity, being flown not only by the state but frequently also by its residents and businesses.

Usage

Salute 
In 2002, the Ohio General Assembly commemorated the 100th anniversary of the state flag's adoption by adopting a salute to the flag, to be recited after the Pledge of Allegiance:

Folding the flag

A method of folding the flag of Ohio was created by Alex Weinstock, a Boy Scout from Junction City, for his Eagle Scout service project. It requires two people. The procedure was passed by the 125th Ohio General Assembly as House Bill 552 and signed into law by Governor Bob Taft on February 15, 2005:

Ohio is not the only state that has designated a folding procedure for its flag; however, Ohio's procedure takes on special importance due to the flag's irregular shape. A flag vendor in Arkansas has described the procedure as "quite a challenge".

Derivations 
Ohio's flag is regularly flown during football games by the Ohio State University Marching Band's "JI-Row" as the percussion section's row mascot. The Columbus Blue Jackets logo and Cincinnati Bengals fan flag are both based on the state flag.

A number of municipalities and counties in Ohio have adopted pennants and swallowtails based on the state burgee. Adams County and the cities of Marysville and Mentor have flags that essentially replace the annulus with a seal and modify the pattern of stars in the triangular union. Additionally, the city of Green uses a burgee for the city flag, altering the colors to green and white stripes, as opposed to the original red and white on the Ohio state flag.

Flag of the Governor 

The flag of the governor of Ohio consists of the Great Seal of Ohio encircled with 13 white stars on a scarlet field, with a five-point star in each corner. Like the state flag, it has 17 stars in total.

The adjutant general's office adopted this design in 1905 to represent the governor on official occasions. One such flag hangs in the Rutherford B. Hayes Center Library, a memorial to the 32nd Ohio governor and 19th U.S. president. The design was officially recognized by the 96th General Assembly effective October 3, 1945:

Since September 30, 1963, the flag has been defined in greater detail:

The Ohio Revised Code also specifies smaller versions of this design to be used as the governor's naval flag and automobile flag.

See also

Flag of Cincinnati
Flag of Cleveland
List of Ohio state symbols
Seal of Ohio
Flags of the U.S. states

References

External links

 State Flag of Ohio  – brochure by the Ohio Secretary of State's office
 
 125th General Assembly of Ohio, H.B. 552
 Ohio's State Flag (1901) – Ohio History Central
 Ohio Flag folding instructions in PDF form 
 Ohio county flags – Ohio Statehouse

Ohio
Symbols of Ohio
Ohio
Ohio culture
Ohio